MCB Tower situated in Karachi, Pakistan was the headquarters of MCB Bank Limited. It is the fifteenth tallest building in Pakistan.

History
Construction began in 2000 and was completed in 2005. The building was designed by Arshad Shah Abdullah. It was the tallest building in the country until 2012.

See also 
List of tallest buildings in Karachi
List of tallest buildings in Pakistan

References

External links 

 MCB Bank Limited 

Skyscrapers in Karachi
Office buildings in Karachi
2005 establishments in Pakistan